Mauro Daniel Fernández Sayes (born 11 August 1997) is a Uruguayan footballer who plays as a defender for Portuguesa in the Venezuelan Primera División.

Career

Juventud de Las Piedras
Fernández signed for Juventud in July 2018, joining from Montevideo-based Liverpool. He made his competitive debut for the club on 20 October 2018, coming on as a 75th-minute substitute for Rodrigo Gómez in a 4–1 victory over Oriental. He scored his first goal for the club over two years later, scoring on the opening day of the 2021 season in a 3–1 victory over Villa Teresa.

Portuguesa
After a short stint with Villa Española in 2021, Fernández joined Venezuelan Primera División club Portuguesa. He made his debut in the club's opening match of the season, a 1–1 draw with Academia Puerto Cabello. In June 2022, Fernández scored his maiden goal for the club; the lone goal in a 1–0 victory over Aragua.

Career statistics

Club

References

External links

1997 births
Living people
Juventud de Las Piedras players
C.S.D. Villa Española players
Portuguesa F.C. players
Uruguayan Primera División players
Uruguayan Segunda División players
Venezuelan Primera División players
Uruguayan expatriate footballers
Uruguayan footballers
Association football defenders
People from Colonia Department